Mael Patraic (died 885) was Abbot of Clonmacnoise.

Mael Patraic was of the Uí Mháine.

References

9th-century Irish abbots
Christian clergy from County Galway
People from County Roscommon
885 deaths
Year of birth unknown